Sharad Govindrao Pawar (Marathi pronunciation: [ʃəɾəd̪ pəʋaːɾ], born 12 December 1940) is an Indian politician. He has served as the Chief Minister of Maharashtra for four ministries. He has served as in the Union Council Of Ministers as the Minister of Defence in the Cabinet of P.V Narsimha Rao and Minister of Agriculture in the Cabinet of Manmahon Singh. He is president of the Nationalist Congress Party (NCP), which he founded in 1999, after separating from the Indian National Congress. He leads the NCP delegation in the Rajya Sabha, the upper chamber of the Indian parliament. He is the chairperson of Maha Vikas Aghadi, a regional Maharashtra-based political alliance.

Pawar comes from Baramati of Maharashtra. He is the patriarch of the Pawar Family an influential political family and a prominent face in Maharashtra politics. Other politicians from the family include his daughter Supriya Sule, Ajit Pawar his nephew, Rohit Rajendra Pawar a nephew's son and other members of his extended family.

Outside of politics, Pawar served as the Chairman of the Board of Control for Cricket in India BCCI from 2005 to 2008 and as the president of the International Cricket Council from 2010 to 2012. He was the president of the Mumbai Cricket Association from October 2013 to January 2017.

In 2017, the Indian government conferred upon him Padma Vibhushan,the second-highest civilian honour of India.

Personal life and family
Pawar is one of the eleven children born to Govindrao Pawar and Shardabai Pawar. The ancestors of Govindrao had moved to Baramati from the nearby Satara. Govindrao had a long career in Sahakari Kharedi Vikri Sangh, a Baramati Farmers' Cooperative. He also managed Shahu boarding, a students' hostel, in the 1940s. In the 1950s he was instrumental in setting up cooperative sugar mills in the Baramati region. Shardabai Pawar was elected to the district local board three times between 1937 and 1952. She looked after the family farm at Katewadi, ten kilometres from Baramati.

Pawar studied at Brihan Maharashtra College of Commerce (BMCC) in Pune. He was an average student but active in student politics. Most of his siblings were well educated and successful in their respective professions.

Vasantrao, the eldest brother of Pawar and a lawyer, was murdered over a land deal by a man who was suspected to be a hired assassin. Pratap Pawar, Pawar's younger brother, runs the Marathi daily newspaper Sakal. Pawar's nephew, Ajit Pawar, is a politician and served as the Deputy Chief Minister of Maharashtra. His grandnephew Rohit Rajendra Pawar represents the Karjat constituency in the Maharashtra Vidhan Sabha.

Pawar is married to Pratibha (née Shinde), daughter of the test cricketer Sadashiv Shinde. They have a daughter, Supriya Sule, who represents the Baramati constituency in the 17th Lok Sabha.

He is the oldest and senior most member of Pawar political dynastic family of Maharashtra. The family have 2 members of parliament and 2 members of legislative assembly in state assembly, among them Ajit Pawar was the deputy chief minister of Maharashtra. The family have their political party. It is an influential family in Maharashtra and India.

In 1999, Pawar was diagnosed with oral cancer due to the habit of chewing gutka, and had oral surgery in April 2004. In March 2021, he underwent surgery for his gallbladder problem.

Political career

Early career
Pawar's first political activity was when he was a schoolboy, he organized a protest march for Goan Independence in Pravaranagar in 1956. At college he was active in student politics. Although his older lawyer brother belonged to Peasants and Workers Party, young Pawar preferred the Congress party and joined Youth Congress in 1958. He later became the president of Poona district (now Pune district) youth Congress in 1962. By 1964, he was one of the two secretaries of Maharashtra youth congress and in regular contact with influential leaders of the party.

1967–1978
Early in his career, Pawar was regarded as a protégé of Yashwantrao Chavan, a highly influential politician from Maharashtra at that time. At the young age of 27 in 1967, Pawar was nominated as the candidate for the Baramati constituency of the Maharashtra Legislative Assembly over more established members by the undivided Congress Party. He won the election and represented the constituency from 1967 to 1990. In 1969, when the Congress party split after the 1969 Indian presidential election he opted for the Congress(R) faction of prime minister Indira Gandhi along with his mentor Yashwantrao Chavan. As the MLA of Baramati in the early 1970s, he was instrumental in building percolation tanks during a severe drought in Maharashtra. Like most Congress party politicians from rural western Maharashtra, he was also heavily involved in the politics of the local cooperative sugar mills and other member run cooperatives societies. In the early 1970s, the then chief minister Vasantrao Naik had been power for a long time and there was jockeying for succession among different factions of the state Congress party. At that time, looking to the future leadership of the party, Yashwantrao Chavan persuaded Naik to bring Pawar into his cabinet as state home affairs minister. Pawar continued as home affairs minister in the 1975-77 government of Shankarrao Chavan, who succeeded Naik as the chief minister.

1978-1987

In the 1977 Lok Sabha elections,  Congress party, under Indira Gandhi, lost power to the Janata Alliance. Taking responsibility for the loss of large number of seats in Maharashtra, chief minister Shankarrao Chavan resigned shortly afterwards and was replaced by Vasantdada Patil. Later in the year, the Congress party split, with Pawar's mentor, Yashwantrao Chavan joining one faction, Congress (U), and Indira Gandhi leading her own faction, Congress (I). Pawar himself joined Congress (U). In the state assembly elections held early in 1978, the two Congress parties ran separately but then formed an alliance to keep power under Vasantdada Patil and deny it to Janata Party which emerged as the biggest single party after the election, but without a majority. Pawar served as Minister of Industry and Labour in the Patil government.

In July 1978, Pawar broke away from the Congress (U) party to form a coalition government with the Janata Party. In the process, at the age of 38, he became the youngest Chief Minister of Maharashtra. This Progressive Democratic Front (PDF) government was dismissed in February 1980, following Indira Gandhi's return to power.

In the 1980 elections Congress (I) won the majority in the state assembly, and A.R. Antulay took over as chief minister. Pawar took over the Presidency of his Indian National Congress (Socialist) Congress (S) party in 1983. For the first time, he won the Lok Sabha election from the Baramati parliamentary constituency in 1984. He also won the state assembly election of March 1985 from Baramati and preferred to return to state politics, and resigned his Lok Sabha seat. Congress (S), won 54 seats out of 288 in the state assembly, and Pawar became the leader of the opposition of PDF coalition which included the BJP, PWP, and the Janata party.

1987–1990
His return to Congress (I) in 1987 has been cited as a reason for the rise of the Shiv Sena at that time. Pawar had stated at the time, "the need to save the Congress Culture in Maharashtra", as his reason for returning to Congress. In June 1988, Prime Minister of India and Congress President Rajiv Gandhi decided to induct then Maharashtra Chief Minister Shankarrao Chavan into his Union Cabinet as Finance Minister and Pawar was chosen to replace Chavan as the chief minister. Pawar had the task of checking the rise of the Shiv Sena in state politics, which was a potential challenge to the dominance of Congress in the state. In the 1989 Lok Sabha elections, Congress won 28 seats out of 48 in Maharashtra. In the state assembly elections of February 1990, the alliance between the Shiv Sena and the Bharatiya Janata Party posed a stiff challenge to Congress. Congress fell short of an absolute majority in the state assembly, winning 141 seats out of 288. Pawar was sworn in as chief minister again on 4 March 1990 with the support of 12 independent or unaffiliated members of the legislative assembly (MLAs).

Early 1990s
During the course of the 1991 election campaign, former Prime Minister Rajiv Gandhi was assassinated. The party elected P.V. Narasimha Rao as the party president. It was expected that the party president would become the prime minister in the event of a Congress victory. However, Pawar at that time had talked about the distinction between party president and prime minister. Also since the Congress contingent from Maharashtra was the largest, Pawar felt he had a legitimate claim for the post of prime minister. However, Pawar eventually decided not to enter the contest, and the Congress Parliamentary Party (party MPs) unanimously elected P.V. Narasimha Rao as their leader, and he was sworn in as prime minister on 21 June 1991. Rao named Pawar as defence minister. On 26 June 1991, Pawar took over that portfolio, and held it until March 1993. After Pawar's successor in Maharashtra, Sudhakarrao Naik, stepped down after the disastrous handling of the Bombay riots, Rao asked Pawar to serve again as chief minister of the state. Pawar was sworn in as chief minister for his fourth term on 6 March 1993. Almost immediately, Mumbai experienced a series of bomb blasts, on 12 March 1993. Pawar's response to the blasts attracted controversy. More than a decade later, Pawar admitted that he had "deliberately misled" people following the bombings, by saying that there were "13 and not 12" explosions, and had added the name of a Muslim-dominated locality to show that people from both communities had been affected. He attempted to justify this deception by claiming that it was a move to prevent communal riots, by falsely portraying that both Hindu and Muslim communities in the city had been affected adversely. He also admitted to lying about evidence recovered and misleading people into believing that it pointed to the Tamil Tigers as possible suspects.

Mid-to-late 1990s
In 1993, the Deputy Commissioner of the Brihanmumbai Municipal Corporation, G. R. Khairnar made a series of accusations against Pawar for being involved in corruption and protecting criminals. Though Khairnar could not produce any evidence in support of his claims, it inevitably affected Pawar's popularity. Notable social worker Anna Hazare started a fast-unto-death to demand the expulsion of 12 officers of the Maharashtra state forest department who had been accused of corruption. The opposition parties accused Pawar's government of trying to shield the corrupt officers.

The 1994 Gowari stampede occurred at Nagpur, during the winter session of the state assembly, and killed 114 people. Nagpur Police were trying to disperse almost 50,000 Gowari and Vanjari protesters using baton charges but the police created panic and triggered a stampede amongst protesters. Allegations were made that the mishap occurred because welfare minister Madhukarrao Pichad did not meet with the delegation of the Vanjari people in time. Though Pichad, accepting moral responsibility for the mishap, stepped down, this incident was another setback to Pawar's government.

After 16 years of protest by the Namantar Andolan (Name-change Movement), the state government finally renamed Marathwada University as Dr. Babasaheb Ambedkar Marathwada University on 14 January 1994, the compromise new name being an expansion of the old name (Namvistar) rather than a complete change of name (Namanatar). As chief minister, Pawar announced few developments in university departments.

New elections to the Vidhan Sabha were held in 1995. The Shiv Sena-BJP coalition was leading Congress in the polls, and there was widespread rebellion in the Congress party. Shiv Sena-BJP won 138 seats while Congress retained only 80 seats in the state assembly. Pawar had to step down and Shiv Sena leader Manohar Joshi took over as chief minister on 14 March 1995. Until the Lok Sabha elections of 1996, Pawar served as the Leader of the Opposition in the state assembly. In the 1996 General elections, Pawar won the Baramati seat in the Lok Sabha and left the state assembly.

In June 1997, Pawar unsuccessfully challenged Sitaram Kesri for the post of President of the Indian National Congress. In the mid-term parliamentary elections of 1998, Pawar not only won his constituency, Baramati, but also led Congress to a win by a large majority of Maharashtra Lok Sabha constituencies. Congress was aligned with the Republican Party of India (Athvale) and Samajwadi Party for the Lok Sabha elections in Maharashtra. The Congress party won 33 Lok Sabha seats outright, and the allied Republican Party of India won 4 more, for a total of 37 out of 48 in the state. Pawar served as Leader of Opposition in the 12th Lok Sabha.

Formation of Nationalist Congress Party
In 1999, after the 12th Lok Sabha was dissolved and elections to the 13th Lok Sabha were called, Pawar, P. A. Sangma, and Tariq Anwar demanded that the party needed to propose someone native-born as the prime ministerial candidate and not the Italian-born Sonia Gandhi, who had entered party politics and replaced Kesri as Congress president. In response, the Congress working committee (CWC) expelled the trio for six years from the party. In response Pawar and Sangma founded the Nationalist Congress Party in June 1999. Despite the falling out, the new party aligned with the Congress party to form a coalition government in Maharashtra after the 1999 state assembly elections to prevent the Shiv Sena-BJP combine from returning to power. Pawar, however, did not return to state politics and Vilasrao Deshmukh of Congress was chosen as chief minister, with Chagan Bhujbal representing the NCP as deputy chief minister.

Minister of agriculture in UPA government

After the 2004 Lok Sabha elections, Pawar joined the United Progressive Alliance (UPA) government headed by Prime Minister Manmohan Singh as the Minister of Agriculture. He retained his portfolio when the UPA coalition government was reelected in 2009. He faced several crisis and controversies during his tenure as Agriculture minister. Critics also point out that during his tenure as the minister agriculture, he spent time on cricket in his role as the president of BCCI than on his ministerial duties.

Wheat imports 
In 2007, the BJP asked for Pawar's resignation after alleging he was involved in a multi-crore Indian rupee (INR) scam involving wheat imports. In May 2007, a tender floated by the Food Corporation of India (FCI) for procurement of wheat was cancelled when the lowest bid received was for US$263/ton. The government subsequently allowed private traders to purchase wheat directly from farmers that year resulting in a paucity of wheat to stock FCI granaries. By July 2007 the shortage at FCI was large enough to require import of wheat at a much higher price of 320–360 USD/ton. Taking advantage of this, traders who had domestically purchased wheat at 900 INR/ton earlier, were now offering the same to FCI at 1,300 INR/ton.

Agricultural produce prices 
As the Minister of Agriculture, Pawar was consistently accused of colluding in the extreme hike in prices of agricultural produce:
 Wheat import in 2007 – The Bombay High Court issued notices to Union agriculture minister Pawar, questioning the decision to import defective red wheat, and asking for a directive to submit details of procurement of the crop from different states and the exact process of importing it.
 Sugar prices in 2009 – Opposition parties, including the BJP and the CPI(M) accused Pawar of engineering a steep rise in the price of sugar to the advantage of hoarders and importers.
 Wheat, Sugar, Rice, and Bean prices in 2009–2010 – The opposition accused Pawar to be responsible on the issue of spiraling prices.

Farmer suicides 
Since the 1990s there had been a high number of farmer suicides in India: in excess of 10,000 per year, and totalling over 200,000 between 1997 and 2010. Pawar, as the agricultural minister, in 2006 had underplayed the rate of farmer suicide in India. However, he claimed at that time that his department was taking the necessary steps to reduce the numbers. His ministry initiated a series of government inquiries to look into the causes of farmers' suicides in 2012. In 2013 Pawar admitted that the suicides was a serious issue with many factors being responsible, and he said the government was increasing investment in agriculture and raising minimum prices of crops to increase farmers' income.

Promotion of endosulfan 
Even though the pesticide endosulfan has been banned, India is slow to phase it out. In spite of its known negative health effects, Pawar made a remark that endosulfan is not yet proved dangerous. This remark prompted activist Vandana Shiva to call him a corrupt minister.

Other issues 
In 2012, Pawar gave up the chairmanship of the Empowered Group of Ministers investigating the 2G spectrum case, days after his appointment by the prime minister, fearing that his association with the decision-making process would drag him into the 2G Spectrum controversy. In 2011, he also decided to resign from the committee that was reviewing the draft of the anti-corruption Lokpal bill after his inclusion in the committee was criticized by the anti-corruption campaigner, Anna Hazare.

Career since 2014 
In January 2012, Pawar announced that he would not contest the 2014 Lok Sabha elections, in order to make way for younger leadership. Pawar is at present a member of the Rajya Sabha. He was elected to the body in April 2014 for a six-year term. He lost his ministerial position when the BJP-led NDA defeated the ruling UPA government, in which Pawar was the minister of agriculture, in the general elections of 2014. Pawar's NCP also lost power in Maharashtra after the 2014 assembly elections. The BJP had won a plurality of seats in the new assembly and initially formed a minority government with the NCP. The BJP's estranged ally, the Shiv Sena later joined the BJP-led government, and that government then did not need the support of the NCP. In May 2017, Pawar ruled out being a candidate for the June 2017 Indian presidential election.

In the 2019 elections to the Lok Sabha, Pawar's NCP and the Congress party had a seat-sharing arrangement. Similarly, despite their differences, the BJP and Shiv Sena once again contested the elections together under the National Democratic Alliance (NDA) banner. The election gave a landslide victory to Narendra Modi's BJP. Out of the 48 seats in Maharashtra, the Congress party won only one seat in the state, whereas the NCP won five seats from its stronghold of western Maharashtra.

The 2019 Lok Sabha elections were soon followed by elections to the Vidhan Sabhaa in October 2019. Predictions for the state's ruling BJP–Shiv Sena alliance to win by a large margin led to a steady stream of defections from the NCP to the ruling alliance. Pawar was the star campaigner for the NCP-Congress alliance in the state.His campaigning during the assembly election was credited with helping not only the NCP but also the leaderless Congress party. Against predictions, the actual voting left the ruling alliance with fewer seats than in 2014. After the election, Pawar thought that his party would remain in opposition in the new assembly. However, differences between the Shiv Sena and the BJP led to a month of political drama, with Pawar and his family playing a pivotal roles. The drama ended with the NCP coming back into power on 28 November 2019, as part of a coalition between Shiv Sena, Congress, and the NCP, led by the Shiv Sena chief, Uddhav Thackeray, as the new chief minister of Maharashtra.

In June 2020, Pawar was re-elected to the Rajya Sabha.

Sports administration
Pawar has interests in cricket, kabbadi, kho kho, wrestling and football.
He has served as the head of various sports organisations, including
 Mumbai Cricket Association
 Maharashtra Wrestling Association
 Maharashtra Kabbadi Association
 Maharashtra Kho Kho Association
 Maharashtra Olympics Association
 Board of Control for Cricket in India President 2005–2008
 International Cricket Council Vice President
 International Cricket Council President
Pawar served as the president of Pune International Marathon Trust, which has hosted Pune International Marathon for last 22 years.

Educational institutions
Early in his public career in 1972, Pawar founded "Vidya pratishthan" for serving the educational needs of the rural poor. The organisation now runs a number of schools at all levels, and colleges specialising in subjects such as information technology, and Biotechnology in Baramati and other locations. Pawar is associated with the Hon. Sharad Pawar Public School, under the Shree Gurudatta Education Society;  Sharad Pawar International School, Pune and the Sharad Pawar Cricket Academy, near Mumbai. Pawar is the current president of the century-old educational organisation Rayat Shikshan Sanstha.

Controversies

Criminal links
In 1992–93, the then Maharashtra Chief Minister Sudhakarrao Naik made a statement that the state leader of Indian National Congress party and erstwhile-Chief Minister Pawar, had asked him to "go easy on Pappu Kalani", a well known criminal-turned-politician. Shiv Sena chief, Bal Thackeray, later concurred with these allegations. Further, Chief Minister Naik also alleged that it was possible that Kalani and Hitendra Thakur, another criminal-turned-politician from Virar, had been given tickets to contest election for the Maharashtra State Legislature at the behest of Pawar, who also put in a word for Naik with the police when the latter was arrested for his role in post-Demolition of the Babri Masjid riots in Mumbai.

Pawar is also alleged to have close links with the underworld don Dawood Ibrahim through Ibrahim's henchman Lakhan Singh based in the Middle East and close relationship with Shahid Balwa, also a suspect in the 2G spectrum case. These allegations were strengthened by the revelation about the involvement of Vinod Goenka, Balwa's business partner, in a controversial commercial project in Yerwada, Pune, which was being constructed under the same survey number as Pawar's family friend, Atul Chordia, had constructed the Panchshil Tech Park. BJP leader Eknath Khadse alleged that it was Balwa who had applied for environmental clearance for the two projects, a charge that Chordia refuted. Coincidentally, Chordia's Panchshil Pvt. Ltd. has Pawar's daughter, Supriya Sule, and her husband Sadanand as investors. The state government's decision to hand over a 3-acre plot of the Yerwada police station for "re-development" to Balwa was retracted following Balwa's arrest.

For several years, confusion existed about the number of blasts in the 1993 Bombay Bombings, whether they were 12 or 13 in number. This was because Pawar, the then chief minister of Maharashtra, stated on television that day that there had been 13 blasts, and included a Muslim-dominated locality in the list. He later revealed that he had lied on purpose, and that there had been only 12 blasts, none of them in Muslim-dominated areas; he also confessed that he had attempted to mislead the public into believing that the blasts could be the work of the LTTE, a Sri Lankan militant organization, when in fact intelligence reports had already confirmed to him that Mumbai's Muslim underworld (known as the "D-Company," a reference to Dawood Ibrahim) were the perpetrators of the serial blasts.

Land allotment
On 27 October 2007, the Bombay High Court served notices to institutions headed by Pawar, Ajit Pawar, and Sadanand Sule (Pawar's son-in-law), along with a corresponding notice served to the Maharashtra Krishna Valley Development Corporation (MKVDC) on why special privileges were given to Pawar and his family. This was done in consideration of Public Interest Litigation No. 148 of 2006, filed by Shamsunder Potare alleging that the said 2002 land allocations in Pune were illegal. The institutions and properties mentioned include:
 Two  plots given allotted to Vidya Pratishthan, an educational society headed by Sharad Pawar
 A  plot allotted to Anant Smriti Pratishthan, headed by Ajit Pawar, the Maharashtra state minister for irrigation and Pawar's nephew
 A  plot allotted to Lavasa Corporation, owned by Sule. Sule handed over his share in 2006.
 A  plot allotted to Shivajinagar Agriculture College
 A  plot allotted to Sharadchandraji Scout and Guide Training Institute.

These allocations were allegedly made by NCP leader and minister Ramraje Naik Nimbalkar who was in charge of MKVDC at the time. Pawar was served a contempt of court notice on 1 May 2008 in connection with this case for issuing statements to the press even though the matter was subjudice at the time. Also in connection with the case, the respondents were directed not to create third-party interests in the property under dispute and to undertake any developments at their own risk.

IPL exemption from tax controversy
In 2010, in the case of tax exemptions of the Indian Premier League (IPL), Shiv Sena MLA Subhash Desai alleged that the state cabinet decided in January to impose the tax, before the year's IPL season started, but the decision was not implemented because of NCP chief Pawar's association with the Board of Control for Cricket in India (BCCI). Bombay High Court in August 2010 said there was "nothing on record" to show that the Union Minister influenced the Maharashtra government's decision to exempt Indian Premier League matches from entertainment tax.

Asset declaration
In 2011, Pawar declared his assets to be worth  as part of a mandatory disclosure, but his critics claimed that his wealth far exceeded the stated amount. In 2010, it was alleged that the Pawar family indirectly held a 16% stake in the City Corporation, which had bid  for the Pune franchise of the Indian Premier League (IPL). Pawar and his family denied the allegations, but the bidders board of the IPL contradicted their claims.

Nira Radia's allegations
In 2011, under investigation of the 2G spectrum case Nira Radia told the Central Bureau of Investigation (CBI) that agriculture minister Pawar may be controlling the controversial DB Realty. According to the reports, she also told the investigative agency that Pawar may have spoken with former telecom minister A. Raja about the allocation of spectrum and licence to Swan Telecom. Radia also said that she had no documentary proof to back up her allegations. Pawar has denied any link with former DB managing director Shahid Balwa who is now in CBI custody.

Lavasa
Pawar is alleged to have demanded compensation for allowing the planned-city Lavasa to be constructed. When Lavasa Corporation was receiving necessary clearances from the government of Maharashtra, relatives of Pawar had part-ownership of the company developing the project. Pawar's daughter and son-in-law had more than 20% ownership between 2002 and 2004, and they later sold their stakes. A nephew of his was chairman of Maharashtra Krishna Valley Development Corporation (MKVDC) when the MKVDC signed off on lease agreements for Lavasa and allowed it to store water and build dams.

Comments on the 2010 Pune bombing
After the 2010 Pune bombing of German Bakery, Pawar appeared to take the incident lightly. He said to the reporters, "It is not alright to arrive at a conclusion that the entire Pune city has been targeted. The place where the blast took place is an isolated area", adding "when I was Chief Minister, Mumbai saw 11 simultaneous blasts but everything returned to normal soon."

Slapping incident
Pawar was slapped by a youth named Harvinder Singh at the New Delhi Municipal Corporation centre while leaving the premises after attending a literary function on 24 November 2011. The attacker, who previously is said to have assaulted former telecom minister Sukh Ram, was later arrested.

Turban controversy
In 2018, Pawar asked party members to felicitate him with the pagadi (turban) of social reformer Mahatma Phule, instead of the usual Puneri Pagadi worn by peshwas (prime ministers) of the Maratha Empire. In response to criticism that he was trying to stir up anti-Brahmin sentiment and appeal to Dalits, Pawar said that he wasn't rejecting any section of society but honoring his idols Phule, Babasaheb Ambedkar, and Shahu Maharaj.

Awards and honours 
 Padma Vibhushan (2017) – In 2017, Pawar was honored with the Padma Vibhushan, India's second highest civilian award, on the recommendation of the Narendra Modi-led BJP government. The timing of the award was questioned by observers and some attributed it to political motivations of the BJP.
 Newsmakers Achievers Awards 2022

See also
 First Sharad Pawar ministry
Political families of Maharashtra

References

Further reading
 P. K. Ravindranath (1 February 1992) Sharad Pawar- the making of a modern maratha South Asia Books. 
 Page 23 of the Times of India, New Delhi, India, Tuesday, 12 December 2006
 Profile at BBC News
 Profile at government of India website

External links

 

Article based on personal experience with Sharad Pawar

1940 births
Living people
Marathi politicians
People from Baramati
Chief Ministers of Maharashtra
Indian cricket administrators
Politicians from Pune
India MPs 2009–2014
India MPs 2004–2009
India MPs 1999–2004
India MPs 1998–1999
India MPs 1996–1997
India MPs 1991–1996
India MPs 1984–1989
Nationalist Congress Party politicians from Maharashtra
Scouting and Guiding in India
Indian politicians with disabilities
Union Ministers from Maharashtra
Leaders of political parties in India
Agriculture Ministers of India
Presidents of the International Cricket Council
Lok Sabha members from Maharashtra
Indian political party founders
Leaders of the Opposition (India)
Leaders of the Opposition in the Maharashtra Legislative Assembly
Rajya Sabha members from Maharashtra
Chief ministers from Indian National Congress
Presidents of the Board of Control for Cricket in India
Indian Congress (Socialist) politicians
Defence Ministers of India
Recipients of the Padma Vibhushan in public affairs
Indian National Congress (U) politicians
Nationalist Congress Party politicians